František Brož (10 April 1896 in Prague – 21 July 1962 in Prague)  was a Czech violist, composer, conductor and music educator.

Biography
Brož studied violin at the Prague Conservatory with Jindřich Baštař. He later studied composition with Josef Bohuslav Foerster and Vítězslav Novák, and conducting under Otakar Ostrčil and Václav Talich. He played viola in the Czech Philharmonic as well as orchestras in Vienna and Istanbul, and was choirmaster of various choral societies in Prague.

For several years Brož was active in Hranice in Moravia conducting the symphony orchestra and choir. He returned to Prague in 1940 where he taught music and conducted the Studio Opera Company. From 1945, Brož taught music theory at the Prague Conservatory, and was also a lecturer at the Academy of Performing Arts in Prague from 1947 to 1950.

Brož's compositions include a ballet, music for orchestra, chamber music, as well as songs and choral works. In 1948 he published a book on basso continuo and figured bass musical notation.

Selected works
Stage
 Pokušení sv. Antonína (The Temptation of St. Anthony), Ballet-Pantomime, Op. 7 (1934, première in Ostrava 1937)

Orchestral
 Bohatýnská tryzna, Preludium a dvojitá fuga (In Commemoration of Heroes), Prelude and Double-fugue, Op. 23 (1954)
 Orchestrální variace (Orchestral Variations), Op. 7      
 Orchestrální suita (Orchestral Suite), Op. 10 (1937)
 Petr Vok, Symphonic Poem
 Sinfonia, Op. 22 (1953)

Concertante
 Chromatické variace (Chromatic Variations) for accordion and orchestra (1956)

Chamber music
 Sonata for violin and piano, Op. 1 (1923)
 String Quartet No. 1 in F minor, Op. 6 (1928)
 Woodwind Quintet, Op. 15 (1944)
 Suite for violin, Op. 17 (1945)
 Jarní sonáta (Spring Sonata) for viola and piano, Op.18 (1946)
 Sonata for cello and piano, Op. 25 (1957)
 String Quartet No. 2 (1960)
 Piano Trio for violin, cello and piano
 Preludium a variace (Prelude and Variations) for violin solo

Organ
 Fantasie a fuga (Fantasy and Fugue), Op. 20 (1948)

Piano
 Prostá hudba (Plain Music), Op. 4 (1925)
 Tři capriccia (3 Capriccios), Op. 12 (1936)

Vocal
 Lidové pisně s průvodem klavíru (Folk Songs with Piano Accompaniment) (1961)
 Boží zahrada (God's Garden), Cycle of 4 Songs for voice and piano
 The Skylark for coloratura soprano and orchestra

Choral
 Vigilie (The Vigils), Cantata da camera for chorus and orchestra, Op. 5 (1928); words by Otokar Březina
 Tři milostné písně (3 Love Songs), Op. 16
 Tři písně (3 Songs) for children's chorus, 3 violins and piano

Literature
 Generálbas a continuo (Generalbass and Continuo) (1948)

Sources
 Gardavský, Čeněk (editor), Contemporary Czechoslovak Composers, Panton, Prague (1965), pages 71–72.

References

1896 births
1962 deaths
20th-century classical composers
Czech classical composers
Czech male classical composers
Czech classical musicians
Czech classical violists
Czech choral conductors
Czech music educators
Academic staff of the Prague Conservatory
Academy of Performing Arts in Prague
Prague Conservatory alumni
20th-century conductors (music)
Musicians from Prague
20th-century Czech male musicians
20th-century violists